A 900 series refers to three consecutive perfect games bowled by an individual bowler. A 300 is a perfect score in one game, thus a player's maximum possible score would be 900 in a series of three consecutive games (the typical number of games in a single league session). To achieve the feat, a bowler would have to bowl 36 consecutive strikes.

Sanctioning
To date in the United States, 39 individuals have bowled a total of 40 certified (or "sanctioned") 900 series – that is, 900s that have been officially recognized by the United States Bowling Congress (USBC), the sport's national governing body in the US.

On 1 July 1982, Glenn Allison bowled the first 900 series to be recorded in sanctioned league play. He achieved this feat using a plastic bowling ball with a conventional drilled grip, on wood lanes, and an oil pattern that would be sanctioned today as sport compliant. This accomplishment was not officially certified by the then-American Bowling Congress (ABC), which cited non-compliant lane conditions. To this day, there is a cult following supporting Glenn Allison and urging the USBC to officially recognize him as the first bowler to achieve a perfect series, especially because it was accomplished before the era of reactive bowling balls, and other scores in the bowling center that night were not unusually high. However, the USBC still refuses to sanction Allison's 900 series after concluding a re-evaluation in 2014, stating among other things that it would call into question all other rejected honor score applications from that era.

In fact, the first six 900 series reported in ABC league play were all rejected for certification. The first perfect series to be officially sanctioned by the ABC/USBC was shot by collegiate bowler Jeremy Sonnenfeld in 1997 at Sun Valley Lanes bowling alley in Lincoln, Nebraska.

The first 900 in the history of the Professional Bowlers Association was bowled by Joe Scarborough on 22 April 2013 in a PBA50 Tour (formerly PBA Senior Tour) event. The PBA had seen three consecutive 300 games on one other occasion, by Norm Duke in 1996, but this was not considered to be an official 900 series because the games were not part of a contiguous set. The first two of Duke's 300 games were at the end of one round of play, and the third was at the beginning of the next round.

Robert Mushtare is the youngest bowler to have rolled a USBC-certified 900 series, doing so on 5 December 2005 at age 17 and is also currently the only bowler to have rolled a second certified 900, a feat achieved on 19 February 2006. On 11 January 2017, John Buchanan III became the oldest bowler (71) in USBC history to roll a sanctioned 900 series.

The 900 Club

References

Bowling
Perfect scores in sports